This is a list of the 71 Members of Parliament (MPs) elected to the House of Commons of the United Kingdom by Scottish constituencies for the Forty-second parliament of the United Kingdom (1959–1964) at the 1959 United Kingdom general election.

The Conservatives won the largest number of votes in Scotland, but narrowly failed to win the most seats in the country.

Composition

Members

References

See also 

 List of MPs for constituencies in Scotland (2019–present)

Lists of MPs for constituencies in Scotland
1959 United Kingdom general election